This is a list of Dollywood attractions.

Adventures in Imagination

Chasing Rainbows
Dolly's Home-On-Wheels
Dreamsong Theater

Country Fair

Craftsman's Valley

Calico Falls Schoolhouse
Eagle Mountain Sanctuary
Robert F. Thomas Chapel

Owens Farm

Pig Pen
Granny's Garden
Li'L Pilot's Playground

Jukebox Junction

Pines theater

Rivertown Junction

Tennessee Mountain Home 
Back porch Theater

Showstreet
Friendship Gardens
Dollywood Celebrity Theater
Showstreet Palace Theater

Timber Canyon

The Village

Heartsong Theater

Wilderness Pass

Wildwood Grove 

 Hidden Hollow-a soft-play area
 Wildwood Tree
 Wildwood Creek

Defunct
 1903 Antique Dentzel Carousel
 Country Fair Falls - Opened in 1969 and closed in 2004
 Flooded Mine (Closed in 1997)
 Scamper (Previously operated at Cedar Point, Operated from 1970-77)
 The Balloon Race
 The Butter Churn (a Trabant) removed at the end of 1986
 Thunder Express
 Timber Tower
 Imagination Cinema
 Adventure Mountain - Opened in 2010 and closed in 2012
 Inventor's Mansion
 River Battle
 Swingamajig
 Wonder Wheel
 Mountain Slidewinder (Ride Closed in 2019)
 Sideshow Spin (formerly VeggieTales Sideshow Spin) - Opened in 2005 and closed in 2016
Timber Canyon Play Area
Tennessee Twister, Spin Ride Closed in (2005) or (2006)

Dollywood